Corner may refer to:

People
Corner (surname)
House of Cornaro, a noble Venetian family (Corner in Venetian dialect)

Places
Corner, Alabama, a community in the United States
Corner Inlet, Victoria, Australia
Corner River, a tributary of Harricana River, in Ontario, Canada
Corner Township, Custer County, Nebraska, a township in the United States

Arts, entertainment, and media

Music
 The Corner (album), an album by the Hieroglyphics
 "The Corner" (song), a 2005 song by Common
 "Corner", a song by Allie Moss from her 2009 EP Passerby
 "Corner", a song by Blue Stahli from their 2010 album Blue Stahli
 "The Corner", a song by Dermot Kennedy from his 2019 album Without Fear
 "The Corner", a song from Staind's 2008 album The Illusion of Progress

Other uses in arts, entertainment, and media
Corner painters, a Danish artists association
The Corner (1916 film), a 1916 film western
The Corner (2014 film), a 2014 Iranian drama film
The Corner, HBO TV series based on Simon and Burns' book
The Corner, a blog from National Review
The Corner: A Year in the Life of an Inner-City Neighborhood, a 1997 bestselling book by David Simon & Ed Burns
WCNR (106.1 FM "The Corner"), a radio station in Charlottesville, Virginia

Sports
Corner kick, a method of restarting play in a game of association football
Cornerback, also known as corner, a position in American and Canadian football
Penalty corner, a method of restarting play in field hockey, awarded following an infringement by the defending team
 The area of canvas near any of the four posts in a boxing ring.

Other uses
Corner (fence)
Corner (route), a pattern run by a receiver in American football
Corner detection, an important task in computer vision
Cornering the market
The Corner (Charlottesville, Virginia), University of Virginia
Müller Corner, a range of yoghurts produced by Müller Dairy
Corner, a point at which a derivative of a mathematical function is discontinuous
Corner, a fixed point in metes and bounds surveying
Corner, an intersection in a road or street
Corner, another word for a Vertex (geometry)

See also
Angle